Antonis Papadimitriou (born 17 March 1972) is a retired Greek football goalkeeper.

References

1972 births
Living people
Greek footballers
Pierikos F.C. players
Panionios F.C. players
PAS Giannina F.C. players
Super League Greece players
Association football goalkeepers